Sunrise, also known as Sunrise Boulevard, is a neighborhood in the city of Long Beach, California.  In 1990, the City of Long Beach by Ordinance C-6834 designated this neighborhood as the "Sunrise Boulevard Historic Landmark District."

History
Originally a ranch, then a milk sanitarium, this neighborhood developed adjacent to the Pacific Electric Railway Balboa Line. Homes are predominantly Craftsman Bungalows, constructed between 1908 and 1924, ranging from large mansions to small-scale workers' housing.

An early motor court, the El Cortez, was built in 1937 at 767 E Sunrise Blvd., on the site of the sanitarium.  It is now the El Cortez Motor Court Apartments.

Today this district is a blend of small-scale bungalows, large-scale Craftsman houses, and mid-scale bungalows in the Craftsman and Spanish Colonial Revival styles.

Location
Sunrise is bordered by the Pacific Electric Railway right-of-way to the south, the city of Signal Hill to the east, Willow Street to the north, and Atlantic Avenue to the west.

Architecture

See also
Neighborhoods of Long Beach, California

Reference List

External links
Detailed description and map of the Historic District as published by the City of Long Beach (PPF file)
History of Sunrise Boulevard

Neighborhoods in Long Beach, California
Populated places established in 1908
1908 establishments in California